The Cippus Abellanus is a stone slab inscribed in the Oscan language. It is one of the most important examples of the Oscan language along with the Tabula Bantina.

Discovery
The Cippus Abellanus was discovered on the site of the ancient town of Abella (now Avella) in 1745, being used as a base for a door.

Description
The Cippus Abellanus is 192 cm high by 55 cm wide and 27cm thick. The engraved letters are 3.5 cm high on average. The date for entries is estimated at the end of the 11th century BCe between -216 and -150. These inscriptions use the Etruscan alphabet.

Cippus Abellanus is an agreement marking the limits between the cities of Abella and Nola around a temple dedicated to Heracles, authored by Q. Fabius Labienus in 183 BC.

In Latin, the word cippus (equivalent of the Greek stêlê) most often designates a post in the form of a pole on which appears information relating to the limits of a territory or its extent (this territory is indicated by the words slaagid-slagím and was recently associated with a still living toponym.

The Cippus Abellanus only partially corresponds to this description because it is not cylindrical or cubic in shape, but flat with two engraved faces (like the Cippus Perusinus).

Text

Side A

Side B

Notes and references

Osco-Umbrian languages
Inscriptions